The 1898 Latrobe Athletic Association season was their fourth season in existence. The team finished 7–3. This season, the team's colors changed from orange and maroon to red and blue.

Schedule

Game notes

References

Latrobe Athletic Association
Latrobe Athletic Association seasons